Tong Shiping (born July 1947) is a retired admiral of the People's Liberation Army Navy (PLAN) of China.  He served as Director of the Political Department of the PLAN, Political Commissar of the PLA National Defence University, and Head of the Commission for Discipline Inspection of the Central Military Commission. He was a member of the 17th Central Committee of the Chinese Communist Party.

Tong was born in Shanghai in July 1947 and joined the PLA in 1968. He graduated from the PLA National Defence University. He attained the rank of rear admiral in July 1998, vice admiral in July 2004, and admiral in July 2010.

References

1947 births
Living people
People's Liberation Army generals from Shanghai
People's Liberation Army Navy admirals
PLA National Defence University alumni